The Battle of Preston (17–19 August 1648), fought largely at Walton-le-Dale near Preston in Lancashire, resulted in a victory for the New Model Army under the command of Oliver Cromwell over the Royalists and Scots commanded by the Duke of Hamilton. The Parliamentarian victory presaged the end of the Second English Civil War.

Background

In 1639, and again in 1640, Charles I, who was king of both Scotland and England in a personal union, went to war with his Scottish subjects in the Bishops' Wars. These had arisen from the Scots' refusal to accept Charles's attempts to reform the Scottish Kirk to bring it into line with English religious practices. Charles was not successful in these endeavours, and the ensuing settlement established the Covenanters' hold on Scottish government, requiring all civil office-holders, parliamentarians and clerics to sign the National Covenant, and giving the Scottish Parliament the authority to approve all the king's councillors in Scotland. After years of rising tensions the relationship between Charles and his English Parliament broke down, starting the First English Civil War in 1642.

In England Charles's supporters, the Royalists, were opposed by the combined forces of the Parliamentarians and the Scots. In 1643 the latter pair formed an alliance bound by the Solemn League and Covenant, in which the English Parliament agreed to reform the English church along similar lines to the Scottish Kirk in return for the Scots' military assistance. After four years of war the Royalists were defeated and Charles surrendered to the Scots on 5 May 1646. The Scots agreed with the English Parliament on a peace settlement which would be put before the king. Known as the Newcastle Propositions, it would have required all the king's subjects in Scotland, England and Ireland to sign the Solemn League and Covenant, brought the church in each kingdom into accordance with the Covenant and with Presbyterianism, and ceded much of Charles's secular authority as King of England to the English Parliament. The Scots spent some months trying to persuade Charles to agree to these terms, but he refused to do so. Under pressure from the English to withdraw their forces now the war was over, the Scots handed Charles over to the English Parliamentary forces in exchange for a financial settlement and left England on 3 February 1647.

Charles now engaged in separate negotiations with different factions. Presbyterian English Parliamentarians and the Scots wanted him to accept a modified version of the Newcastle Propositions, but in June 1647, Cornet George Joyce of the New Model Army seized Charles, and the army council pressed him to accept the Heads of Proposals, a less demanding set of terms which, crucially, did not require a Presbyterian reformation of the church. He rejected these as well and instead signed an offer known as the Engagement, which had been thrashed out with the Scottish delegation, on 26 December 1647. Charles agreed to confirm the Solemn League and Covenant by Act of Parliament in both kingdoms, and to accept Presbyterianism in England, but only for a trial period of three years, in return for the Scots' assistance in regaining his throne in England.

When the delegation returned to Edinburgh with the Engagement, the Scots were bitterly divided on whether to ratify its terms. Its supporters, who became known as the Engagers, argued that it offered the best chance the Scots would get of acceptance of the Covenant across the three kingdoms, and that rejecting it risked pushing Charles to accept the Heads of Proposals. It was opposed by those who believed that to send an army into England on behalf of the king would be to break the Solemn League and Covenant, and that it offered no guarantee of a lasting Presbyterian church in England; the Kirk went so far as to issue a declaration on 5 May 1648 condemning the Engagement as a breach of God's law. After a protracted political struggle, the Engagers gained a majority in the Scottish Parliament, by which time war had again broken out in England between Royalists and Parliamentarians. The Scots sent an army under the command of the Duke of Hamilton into England to fight on behalf of the king.

Campaign
On 8 July 1648, when the Scottish Engager army crossed the Border in support of the English Royalist, the military situation was well defined. For the Parliamentarians, Cromwell besieged Pembroke in South Wales, Fairfax besieged Colchester in Essex, and Colonel Edward Rossiter besieged Pontefract and Scarborough in the north.  On 11 July, Pembroke fell and Colchester followed on 28 August. Elsewhere, however, the rebellion, which had been put down by rapidity of action rather than sheer weight of numbers, still smouldered. Charles, the Prince of Wales, with the fleet cruised along the Essex coast. Cromwell and John Lambert, however, understood each other perfectly, while the Scottish commanders quarrelled with each other and with Sir Marmaduke Langdale (the English Royalist commander in the north west).

As the English Royalist uprisings were close to collapse, it was on the adventures of the Engager Scottish army that the interest of the war centred. It was by no means the veteran army of the Earl of Leven, which had long been disbanded. For the most part it consisted of raw levies and, as the Kirk Party had refused to sanction The Engagement (an agreement between Charles I and the Scots Parliament for the Scots to intervene in England on behalf of Charles), David Leslie and thousands of experienced officers and men declined to serve. The leadership of the Duke of Hamilton proved to be a poor substitute for that of Leslie.  Hamilton's army, too, was so ill provided that as soon as England was invaded it began to plunder the countryside for the bare means of sustenance.

On 8 July the Scots, with Langdale as advanced guard, were about Carlisle, and reinforcements from Ulster were expected daily. Lambert's horse were at Penrith, Hexham and Newcastle, too weak to fight and having only skilful leading and rapidity of movement to enable them to gain time.

Appleby Castle surrendered to the Scots on 31 July, whereat Lambert, who was still hanging on to the flank of the Scottish advance, fell back from Barnard Castle to Richmond so as to close Wensleydale against any attempt of the invaders to march on Pontefract. All the restless energy of Langdale's horse was unable to dislodge Lambert from the passes or to find out what was behind that impenetrable cavalry screen. The crisis was now at hand. Cromwell had received the surrender of Pembroke Castle on 11 July, and had marched off, with his men unpaid, ragged and shoeless, at full speed through the Midlands. Rains and storms delayed his march, but he knew that Hamilton in the broken ground of Westmorland was still worse off. Shoes from Northampton and stockings from Coventry met him, at Nottingham, and, gathering up the local levies as he went, he made for Doncaster, where he arrived on 8 August, having gained six days in advance of the time he had allowed himself for the march. He then called up artillery from Hull, exchanged his local levies for the regulars who were besieging Pontefract, and set off to meet Lambert.

On 12 August Cromwell was at Wetherby, Lambert with horse and foot at Otley, Langdale at Skipton and Gargrave. Hamilton was at Lancaster, and Sir George Monro with the Scots from Ulster and the Carlisle Royalists (organized as a separate command owing to friction between Monro and the generals of the main army) at Hornby.

On 13 August, while Cromwell was marching to join Lambert at Otley, the Scottish leaders were still disputing whether they should make for Pontefract or continue through Lancashire so as to join Lord Byron and the Cheshire Royalists.

The battle
On 14 August 1648 Cromwell and Lambert were at Skipton, on 15 August at Gisburn and on 16 August they marched down the valley of the Ribble towards Preston with full knowledge of the enemy's dispositions and full determination to attack him. They had with them horse and foot not only of the Army, but also of the militia of Yorkshire, Durham, Northumberland and Lancashire, and withal were slightly outnumbered, having only 8,600 men against perhaps 9,000 of Hamilton's command. However the latter were scattered for convenience of supply along the road from Lancaster, through Preston, towards Wigan, Langdale's corps having thus become the left flank guard instead of the advanced guard.

Langdale called in his advanced parties, perhaps with a view to resuming the duties of advanced guard, on the night of 13 August, and collected them near Longridge. It is not clear whether he reported Cromwell's advance, but, if he did, Hamilton ignored the report, for on 17 August Monro was half a day's march to the north, Langdale east of Preston, and the main army strung out on the road to Wigan, Major-General William Baillie with a body of foot, the rear of the column, being still in Preston. Hamilton, yielding to the importunity of his lieutenant-general, James Livingston, 1st Earl of Callendar, sent Baillie across the Ribble to follow the main body just as Langdale, with 3,000 foot and 500 horse only, met the first shock of Cromwell's attack on Preston Moor. Hamilton, like Charles at Edgehill, passively shared in, without directing, the Battle of Preston, and, though Langdale's men fought magnificently, they were after four hours' struggle driven to the Ribble.

Baillie attempted to cover the Ribble and Darwen bridges on the Wigan road, but Cromwell had forced his way across both before nightfall. Pursuit was at once undertaken, and not relaxed until Hamilton had been driven through Wigan and Winwick to Uttoxeter and Ashbourne. There, pressed furiously in rear by Cromwell's horse and held up in front by the militia of the midlands, the remnant of the Scottish army laid down its arms on 25 August. Various attempts were made to raise the Royalist standard in Wales and elsewhere, but Preston was the death-blow to the Royalist hopes in the Second Civil War.

Cromwell estimated the Royalist losses at 2,000 killed and 9,000 captured. Those among the prisoners who had served voluntarily were bound for servile labour in the New World, and when there was no more demand there, for service in the Republic of Venice When the English Parliament decreed a day of thanksgiving for the victory, it was announced that Cromwell's army had "one hundred at the most" killed.

Notes, citations and sources

Notes

Citations

Sources

 

 

 

 
 
 
 
 
 
 

 

 
 
 
 
  
 

Attribution

Further reading
 Sir Marmaduke Langdale's letter (26 August 1648) and an account of his capture extracted from Memoirs Of The Life Of Colonel Hutchinson by Lucy Hutchinson.
. "There are four accounts of this [battle] by eye-witnesses, still accessible: Cromwell's account in these Two Letters; a Captain Hodgson's rough brief recollections written afterwards; and on the other side, Sir Marmaduke Langdale's Letter in vindication of his conduct there; and lastly the deliberate Narrative of Sir James Turner."

External links

1648: The Second Civil War 
 The Battle of Winwick Pass, 19 Aug 1648

1648 in England
1648 in Scotland
Preston 1648
Preston (1648)
Preston (1648)
History of Preston
Preston 1648
17th century in Lancashire
Massacres during the Wars of the Three Kingdoms